Filippo Lenti (1633 – September 1684) was a Roman Catholic prelate who served as Bishop of Ascoli Satriano (1680–1684).

Biography
Filippo Lenti was born in Ascoli Piceno, Italy in 1633.
On 29 April 1680, he was appointed  Bishop of Ascoli Satriano by Pope Innocent XI. On 1 May 1680, he was consecrated bishop by Federico Baldeschi Colonna, Cardinal-Priest of San Marcello, with Francesco Casati, Titular Archbishop of Trapezus, and Prospero Bottini, Titular Archbishop of Myra, serving as co-consecrators. He served as Bishop of Ascoli Satriano until his death in September 1684.

References

External links and additional sources
 (for Chronology of Bishops) 
 (for Chronology of Bishops) 

17th-century Italian Roman Catholic bishops
Bishops appointed by Pope Innocent XI
1633 births
1684 deaths